The Diving Medical Advisory Council (DMAC) is an independent organisation of diving medical specialists, mostly from across Northern Europe which exists to provide expert advice about medical and some safety aspects of commercial diving. The advice is published in the form of guidance documents, which are made available for download.

The committee has also issued position statements on the following subjects:
Commercial Diving and Health (October 2006)
Health Surveillance of Commercial Divers (April 2008)
Exercise Testing in Medical Assessment of Commercial Divers (October 2009)
Requirement for Air Diving to 50 msw in Commercial Diver Training (March 2013)
Deep Saturation Diving (April 2013)
Education and Training in Diving Medicine (November 2014)

Publications
The DMAC diving medical guidance publications are freely downloadable from the website, and include:
 DMAC 01: Aide-mémoire for recording and transmission of medical data to shore 
 DMAC 02: In-water diver monitoring
 DMAC 03: Accidents with high-pressure water jets 
 DMAC 04: Oxygen content in open circuit bail-out bottles for heliox saturation diving 
 DMAC 05: Recommendation on minimum level of O2 in helium supplied offshore
 DMAC 06: The effects of sonar transmission on commercial diving activities
 DMAC 07: Flying after diving: Recommendations
 DMAC 08: Thermal stress in relation to diving (Report of a workshop held in March 1981)
 DMAC 11: Provision of first aid and the training of divers, supervisors and members of dive teams in first aid 
 DMAC 12: Safe diving distance from seismic surveying operations
 DMAC 13: Fitness to return to diving after decompression illness
 DMAC 15: Medical equipment to be held at the site of an offshore diving operation
 DMAC 18: Human Immunodeficiency Virus (HIV) Infection and Acquired Immune Deficiency Syndrome (AIDS) in Commercial Diving
 DMAC 19: The effects of water vapour on diver physiology
 DMAC 20: Duration of bell lockouts
 DMAC 21: Guidance on the duration of saturation exposures and surface intervals between saturations 
 DMAC 22: Proximity to a recompression chamber after surfacing
 DMAC 23: The use of heliox in treating decompression sickness
 DMAC 24: Differential diagnosis
 DMAC 26: Saturation diving chamber hygiene
 DMAC 28: The provision of emergency medical care for divers in saturation
 DMAC 29: Approval of diving medicine courses
 DMAC 30: Management in divers of osteonecrosis at Ficat stage 1
 DMAC 31: Accelerated emergency decompression (AED) from saturation
 DMAC 32: Guidance on dealing with the body of a deceased diver in saturation 
 Workshop: Accelerated emergency decompression from saturation in commercial diving operations (Report of a workshop held in April 2011)
 Workshop: Improving diver safety current medical issues (Report of a workshop held in October 2014)
(missing numbers have been withdrawn or superseded)

Courses
DMAC approves training courses in diving medicine which comply with the requirements of the joint committee of the European Committee for Hyperbaric Medicine (ECHM) and the European Diving Technology Committee (EDTC) "Training Standards for Diving and Hyperbaric Medicine", which specifies: Level 1 - Medical assessment of divers (Medical Examiner of Divers), and Level 2D - Medical management of diving accidents and illnesses (Diving Medical Physician).

Use of DMAC guidance documents
Canadian association of diving contractors members are required in terms of CSA Z275.2-15 Occupational Safety Code for Diving Operations Items 8 and 9,  to comply with DMAC guidance documents for surface-supplied offshore gas and oil diving and deep diving, including mixed gas and saturation diving.

References

Diving medicine organizations